The 2014–15 Missouri State Bears basketball team represented Missouri State University during the 2014–15 NCAA Division I men's basketball season. The Bears, led by fourth year head coach Paul Lusk, played their home games at JQH Arena and were members of the Missouri Valley Conference. They finished the season 11–20, 5–13 in MVC play to finish in eighth place. They lost in the first round of the Missouri Valley tournament to Southern Illinois.

Previous season 
The Bears finished the season 20–13, 9–9 in Missouri Valley play to finish in a three way tie for fourth place. They advanced to the semifinals of the Missouri Valley tournament where they lost to Wichita State. They were invited to the CollegeInsider.com Tournament where they lost in the first round to Murray State.

Departures

Incoming Transfers

Incoming recruits

Roster

Schedule

|-
!colspan=9 style="background:#800000; color:#FFFFFF;"| Exhibition

|-
!colspan=9 style="background:#800000; color:#FFFFFF;"| Regular season

|-
!colspan=12 style="background:#800000; color:#FFFFFF;"| Missouri Valley Conference regular season

|-
!colspan=9 style="background:#800000; color:#FFFFFF;"| Missouri Valley tournament

* December 7's game vs Missouri State was postponed due to a power outage.

References

Missouri State Bears basketball seasons
Missouri State